2 Chronicles 10 is the tenth chapter of the Second Book of Chronicles the Old Testament in the Christian Bible or of the second part of the Books of Chronicles in the Hebrew Bible. The book is compiled from older sources by an unknown person or group, designated by modern scholars as "the Chronicler", and had the final shape established in late fifth or fourth century BCE. This chapter belongs to the section focusing on the kingdom of Judah until its destruction by the Babylonians under Nebuchadnezzar and the beginning of restoration under Cyrus the Great of Persia  (2 Chronicles 10 to 36). The focus of this chapter is the kingdom of Israel's division in the beginning of Rehoboam's reign.

Text
This chapter was originally written in the Hebrew language and is divided into 19 verses.

Textual witnesses
Some early manuscripts containing the text of this chapter in Hebrew are of the Masoretic Text tradition, which includes the Aleppo Codex (10th century), and Codex Leningradensis (1008).

There is also a translation into Koine Greek known as the Septuagint, made in the last few centuries BCE. Extant ancient manuscripts of the Septuagint version include Codex Vaticanus (B; B; 4th century), and Codex Alexandrinus (A; A; 5th century).

Old Testament references
: 
:

Rebellion against Rehoboam (10:1–15)
The whole passage (until verse 19) parallels 1 Kings 12:1–19 with only a few verbal alterations. After inheriting the throne from his father, Rehoboam went to Shechem to be confirmed as king. The northern tribes of Israel called Jeroboam (who fled to Egypt for fear of Solomon) to lead them in requesting a relaxation of financial burden applied by Solomon. Rehoboam, refusing the old men's counsel, but following the advice of young men, replied to them roughly, so ten tribes (not including Judah and Benjamin) revolted and established the northern kingdom, killed Hadoram, Rehoboam's officer, and forced Rehoboam to flee to Jerusalem (verse 18).

Verse 1
And Rehoboam went to Shechem for to Shechem were all Israel come to make him king.

The kingdom divided (10:16–19)
The kingdom's division is presented in the Chronicles as God's will, in accordance with interpretation of 1 Kings, although some facts about Solomon's falling away and Jeroboam's background (explained in the 1 Kings 11) are not reported. The war with Jeroboam was only a side issue in this chapter and is elaborated in chapter 13 (cf. 1 Kings 12).

Verse 18
Then king Rehoboam sent Hadoram that was over the tribute; and the children of Israel stoned him with stones, that he died. But king Rehoboam made speed to get him up to his chariot, to flee to Jerusalem.
 "Hadoram": In the parallel verse  this name appears as "Adoram" (following Masoretic Text) or "Adoniram" (according to the Old Greek translation and Syriac Peshitta; cf. 1 Kings 4:6).

See also

Related Bible parts: Genesis 12, Genesis 33, Genesis 34; Genesis 35, Genesis 37, Genesis 43, Genesis 49, Deuteronomy 27, Joshua 8, Joshua 17, Joshua 20; Joshua 21, Joshua 24, 1 Kings 1, 1 Kings 10, 1 Kings 11, 1 Kings 12, 1 Chronicles 6, 1 Chronicles 22, 1 Chronicles 29, Matthew 12, Luke 11

Notes

References

Sources

External links
 Jewish translations:
 Divrei Hayamim II - II Chronicles - Chapter 10 (Judaica Press) in Hebrew and English translation [with Rashi's commentary] at Chabad.org
 Christian translations:
 Online Bible at GospelHall.org (ESV, KJV, Darby, American Standard Version, Bible in Basic English)
 2 Chronicles Chapter 10. Bible Gateway

10